Field Marshal George Hamilton, 1st Earl of Orkney, KT (9 February 1666 – 29 January 1737), styled Lord George Hamilton from 1666 to 1696, was a British soldier and Scottish nobleman and the first British Army officer to be promoted to the rank of field marshal. After commanding a regiment for the cause of William of Orange during the Williamite War in Ireland, he commanded a regiment in the Low Countries during the Nine Years' War. He then led the final assault at the Battle of Blenheim attacking the village churchyard with eight battalions of men and then receiving the surrender of its French defenders during the War of the Spanish Succession. He also led the charge of fifteen infantry battalions in an extremely bloody assault on the French entrenchments at the Battle of Malplaquet. In later life, he became a Lord of the Bedchamber to George I and was installed as Governor of Edinburgh Castle.

Early life 
Born the son of William Douglas, 1st Earl of Selkirk and Anne, 3rd Duchess of Hamilton, Hamilton was commissioned into the His Majesty's Royal Regiment of Foot, a regiment for which his uncle, Lord Dumbarton, held the colonelcy, on 9 May 1684.

Military career

Ireland and the Low Countries 
Hamilton became a lieutenant colonel of Lloyd's Regiment of Enniskillen Foot in June 1689 and, having been promoted to brevet colonel, commanded the regiment at the Battle of the Boyne in July 1690, at the siege of Athlone in June 1691 and at the Battle of Aughrim, where he was wounded, in July 1691 during the Williamite War in Ireland. He also commanded the regiment at the siege of Limerick in October 1691 and then became colonel of the Royal Fusiliers in January 1692 before fighting with that regiment at the Battle of Steenkerque in August 1692 in the Low Countries during the Nine Years' War. Rewarded with the colonelcy of the 1st Regiment of Foot in late 1692, he participated in further battles in Ireland before returning to the continent to fight at the Battle of Landen in July 1693 and at the siege of Namur, where he was wounded, in July 1695 during the latter stages of the Nine Years' War.

On 25 November 1695 Hamilton married Elizabeth Villiers, a favourite and perhaps former mistress of William III, and on 3 January 1696 he was created Earl of Orkney, Viscount Kirkwall, and Baron Dechmont in the Peerage of Scotland. Shortly thereafter he acquired the estates of Taplow Court and Cliveden. He became Governor of Virginia in 1698 but appears never to have visited the colony.

War of the Spanish Succession 

Promoted to major general on 9 March 1702, Hamilton fought under John Churchill, 1st Duke of Marlborough at the siege of Stevensweert in October 1702 during the War of the Spanish Succession. Promoted to lieutenant general on 1 January 1704, he was appointed a Knight of the Order of the Thistle later that year. He led the final assault at the Battle of Blenheim attacking the village churchyard with eight battalions of men and then receiving the surrender of its French defenders in August 1704. After marching his column from the Moselle, he relieved the besieged city of Liège in June 1705.

Hamilton led a diversion at the Battle of Ramillies but turned the manoeuvre into a highly successful assault, from which he had to withdraw before leading the relentless pursuit of the defeated French troops in May 1706. He also took part in the siege of Menin in July 1706 and then played a major role at the Battle of Oudenarde in July 1708. He also saw action at the passage of the Scheldt in November 1708, fought at the siege of Tournai in June 1709 and led the charge of fifteen infantry battalions in an extremely bloody assault on the French entrenchments at the Battle of Malplaquet in September 1709. Promoted to general of foot in 1710, Hamilton was appointed Lord Lieutenant of Lanarkshire in 1711. He returned to the continent in 1712 and continued to serve in the Army commanded by the Duke of Ormonde besieging Douai and then Bouchain until 1713.

Later life 
Hamilton became a Lord of the Bedchamber to George I and was installed as Governor of Edinburgh Castle in 1714. He also sat in the House of Lords as a Scottish representative peer. Promoted to field marshal (the first-ever promotion to this rank) on 31 January 1735, he commissioned the building of a temple at his Buckinghamshire home, Cliveden, by the architect Giacomo Leoni later that year.

Hamilton died at his home at Albemarle Street in London on 29 January 1737 and was buried at Taplow Court. In 1733 Michael Rysbrack, a sculptor from Antwerp, carved a marble bust of Hamilton in the form of a Roman centurion. As a boy, Rysbrack would have witnessed Hamilton's unopposed entry into Antwerp shortly after his victory at Ramillies. The bust is now in the Victoria and Albert Museum.

Family
In 1695 Hamilton married Elizabeth Villiers, a former mistress of William III; they had three daughters:
 Lady Anne, suo jure Countess of Orkney, married William O'Brien, 4th Earl of Inchiquin
 Lady Frances, married Thomas Lumley-Saunderson, 3rd Earl of Scarbrough
 Lady Henrietta, married John Boyle, 5th Earl of Cork and Orrery.

References

Sources

Further reading

|-

1666 births
1737 deaths
Knights of the Thistle
Royal Scots officers
British field marshals
Scottish representative peers
Earls of Orkney
Colonial governors of Virginia
Scottish soldiers
Scottish generals
British Army generals
British army commanders in the War of the Spanish Succession
George Hamilton, 1st Earl of Orkney
British military personnel of the Nine Years' War
Williamite military personnel of the Williamite War in Ireland
Peers of Scotland created by William II
Younger sons of dukes
Younger sons of earls
Royal Fusiliers officers